"Where My Lips Have Been" is a song recorded by American singer Dionne Warwick. It was written by Robert Charles Burns, Sandy Knox, and Don Huber for her studio album Friends Can Be Lovers (1993), while production was helmed by Barry Eastmond. The sensual, downtempo ballad was released as the album's second single in 1993, and peaked at number 95 on the US Hot R&B/Hip-Hop Songs.

Background
"Where My Lips Have Been" was written by Robert Charles Burns, Sandy Knox, and Don Huber and produced by Barry Eastmond for Warwick's tenth album with Arista Records, Friends Can Be Lovers (1993). The sensual, downtempo ballad  features Everette Harp on the saxophone. In her 2011 autobiography My Life, As I See It, Warwick revealed her discontent with the song and its parent album, writing: "I hated this project. I did not feel the songs or production met the standards I was accustomed to. The one song that I still feel uncomfortable even mentioning is 
"Where My Lips Have Been." It was a lot – not a little – outside of the messages I was known to deliver lyrically, and I think it tested me to the brink."

Track listings

Credits and personnel
Credits lifted from the liner notes of Friends Can Be Lovers.

Ray Bardani – mixing
Robert Charles Burns – writer
Todd Childress – mixing assistance
Earl Cohen – engineer
Barry Eastmond – arranger, keyboards, producer
Everette Harp – alto sax
Don Huber – writer
Sandy Knox – writer
Yolanda Lee – background vocals
Sammy Merendino – drum programming
Eric Rehl – keyboards, keyboard programming
Mike Ross – engineer
Joe Schiff – engineer
Ira Siegel – guitar
Dionne Warwick – vocals

Charts

References

Songs about kissing
1993 singles
Dionne Warwick songs
1993 songs
Arista Records singles